The men's 400 metres at the 2018 IAAF World Indoor Championships took place on 2 and 3 March 2018.

Summary
For the first time ever in a World Championship, every runner in a single preliminary heat was disqualified.  It was the third heat, where first returning silver medalist Abdalelah Haroun false started himself out of the heat.  #5 runner of all time Bralon Taplin won the heat, but he and the other three remaining runners Austris Karpinskis, Alonzo Russell and Steven Gayle were then disqualified for lane violations.

2012 Champion Nery Brenes also found himself disqualified after winning the fifth heat.  With two place qualifiers missing, it opened the door for Juander Santos and Mikhail Litvin to take the extra time qualification positions in the semi-final round.

In the final, Óscar Husillos from lane 6 was first to the break line and took the lead with a lap to go, holding the lead to cross the finish line first in a time of 44.92. However, Husillos and Luguelin Santos were disqualified for lane violations, giving Pavel Maslák his third consecutive championship, Michael Cherry the silver, and Deon Lendore the bronze.

Results

Heats
The heats were started on 2 March at 11:20.

Semifinal
The semifinals were started on 2 March at 21:06.

Final

The final was started on 3 March at 20:20.

References

400 metres
400 metres at the World Athletics Indoor Championships
2018 in men's athletics